Earth–Life Science Institute (ELSI) is an established independent permanent scientific research institute based at the Tokyo Institute of Technology in Japan. ELSI employs more than 70 scientists in disciplines ranging from astrophysics to biology, who perform collaborative research on the broad connections between the origin and evolution of planets and life.

History
ELSI was established in 2012 with a charter to build a bridge between the Earth and Life sciences by rallying researchers around questions concerning the link between the origins of planets and life. ELSI has satellite-institutes at Ehime University, Harvard University, and the Institute for Advanced Study, and is currently led by Director Kei Hirose and Vice Directors Shigeru Ida and John Hernlund.

Funding sources
Funding sources for the institute include a combination of support from Japan's World Premiere International Research Center Initiative (approximately $7M/year), a grant from the John Templeton Foundation to establish the ELSI Origins Network (EON, $5.6M for three years), a variety of project grants from the Japan Society for the Promotion of Science (JSPS), and anonymous private donations.

References

External links
 Earth–Life Science Institute 
 World Premiere International Research Centers institutions

Research in Asia
Research in Japan
Research institutes in Japan
Academia in Japan
2012 establishments in Japan
Tokyo Institute of Technology